Deán Valdivia District is one of six districts of the province Islay in Peru.

References